Westraltrachia recta is a species of air-breathing land snails, a terrestrial pulmonate gastropod mollusk in the family Camaenidae.
This species is endemic to Australia.

References

 2006 IUCN Red List of Threatened Species.   Downloaded on 7 August 2007.

Gastropods of Australia
recta
Vulnerable fauna of Australia
Gastropods described in 1984
Taxonomy articles created by Polbot